The North East (often hyphenated to the North-East) is the one of the six geopolitical zones of Nigeria representing both a geographic and political region of the country's northeast. It comprises six states – Adamawa, Bauchi, Borno, Gombe, Taraba, and Yobe.

Geographically, the North East is the largest geopolitical zone in the nation, covering nearly one-third of Nigeria's total area. In terms of the environment, the zone is primarily divided between the semi-desert Sahelian savanna and the tropical West Sudanian savanna ecoregions.

The region has a population of about 26 million people, around 12% of the total population of the country. Maiduguri and Bauchi are the most populous cities in the North East as well as the fifteenth and seventeenth most populous cities in Nigeria. Other large northeastern cities include (in order by population) Bauchi, Yola, Mubi, Gombe, Jimeta, Potiskum, Jalingo, Gashua, and Bama.

References
 

 Latest News and updates from North East Nigeria at NortheastReporters.com
Subdivisions of Nigeria